Ricardo Penella Arias (born 25 February 1957) is a Spanish retired footballer who played as a sweeper.

He appeared in 501 competitive games for Valencia, winning three major titles including the 1980 Cup Winners' Cup. In La Liga, he played 377 matches and scored twice.

Club career
Born in Catarroja, Valencian Community, Arias spent 16 of his 17 professional seasons – 15 in La Liga – with local club Valencia CF. He made his debut in the competition on 7 November 1976 by coming on as a late substitute in a 3–1 home win against CD Málaga, and scored his first goal on 5 March 1978 to help defeat Sevilla FC 3–0 also at the Mestalla Stadium. He contributed eight matches and one goal in the team's victorious run in the UEFA Cup Winners' Cup, converting his attempt in the shootout in the final (0–0 after 120 minutes, in Brussels).

Subsequently, Arias went on to become a defensive mainstay for the Che. They suffered relegation at the end of 1985–86, being immediately promoted the following campaign with one goal in 34 games from the player.

After only 16 appearances in 1991–92, the 35-year-old Arias signed for neighbouring CD Castellón in the Segunda División, closing out his career at the end of the season.

International career
Arias earned one cap for Spain: on 26 September 1979, he played the first half of a 1–1 friendly draw with Portugal, at Balaídos.

Post-retirement
In November 2014, Arias declared in an interview he was bankrupt, making ends meet by having odd jobs. Shortly after, the father of four returned to Valencia to work in the club's social department.

Honours
Valencia
Copa del Rey: 1978–79
UEFA Cup Winners' Cup: 1979–80
UEFA Super Cup: 1980
Segunda División: 1986–87

References

External links

Stats and bio at CiberChe 

1957 births
Living people
People from Horta Sud
Sportspeople from the Province of Valencia
Spanish footballers
Footballers from the Valencian Community
Association football defenders
La Liga players
Segunda División players
Valencia CF players
CD Castellón footballers
Spain amateur international footballers
Spain B international footballers
Spain international footballers
Valencia CF non-playing staff